Keki Khambatta (born 17 December 1910, date of death unknown) was an Indian cricketer. He played four first-class matches for Bengal between 1935 and 1938.

See also
 List of Bengal cricketers

References

External links
 

1910 births
Year of death missing
Indian cricketers
Bengal cricketers
Cricketers from Ahmedabad